Lubliner may refer to:
Hugo Lubliner
Lubliner Sztyme